Coral Press is a small, New York City-based independent publisher of musical fiction. Founded in 2001 by Robert Dunn, it specializes in publishing musical fiction books. It has made efforts to create a new musical genre called "mus-fi." Their books are distributed by Thomson-Shore Distribution.

Novels published by Coral Press include:
Pink Cadillac (2001) by Robert Dunn
Cutting Time (2003) by Robert Dunn
Lone Star Ice and Fire (2005) by L.E. Brady
Soul Cavalcade (2006) by Robert Dunn
Meet the Annas (2007) by Robert Dunn
Getting in Tune (2008) by Roger L. Trott
Look At Flower (2011) by Robert Dunn
Stations of the Cross (2013) by Robert Dunn
Roadie (2016) by Howard Massey
Savage Joy (2017) by Robert Dunn

Coral Press Arts

In 2011, Coral Press established Coral Press Arts to publish photobooks. Their first book was Robert Dunn's OWS, about Occupy Wall Street. Photos from that book were in an International Center of Photography show in 2012. Later books include Dunn's ongoing series exploring the zone between reality and imagination, Angel Parade #1 and #2, and Angel Parade #3 and #4. David Fratkin's WILLYOUPLEASEJUSTBEMYFUCKINGVALENTINE came out in 2012, as well as Dunn's Meeting Robert Frank. All Coral Press Arts photobooks are in the permanent collection of the International Center of Photography library.

References

External links
Coral Press website
Coral Press Arts website

Book publishing companies based in New York (state)
Small press publishing companies
Privately held companies based in New York City
Publishing companies established in 2001